Nicholas Jacob Martin (born April 29, 1993) is an American football center. He played college football at Notre Dame and was drafted by the Houston Texans in the second round of the 2016 NFL Draft. Martin has also been a member of the Las Vegas Raiders, New Orleans Saints, and Washington Commanders.

Early years
Martin and his brother, Zack, attended Saint Matthew Catholic grade school, Indianapolis, Indiana, from kindergarten through eighth grade.  Both Martins were products of the Catholic Youth Organization (CYO) football program from third grade to eighth grade.

High school career
Martin attended Bishop Chatard High School in Indianapolis, Indiana. As a senior, he helped lead Bishop Chatard to the 2010 Indiana Class 3A state title. He was named a first-team Indiana all-state pick on the Associated Press Class 3A team as offensive lineman.

Considered a three-star recruit by Rivals.com, he was rated as the 68th-best offensive tackle prospect of his class. Originally committed to play college football at Kentucky, Martin switched his commitment to Notre Dame.

College career
After his first two seasons as a reserve, Martin emerged as a starter in 2013, starting on the offensive line with his brother, Zack. Martin started 11 games, before sustaining a season-ending knee injury against BYU. Martin returned to form in 2014, and was a named a team captain. Martin started the first three games at center, before an injury to his snapping hand resulted in his move to offensive guard, where he started the remaining 10 games of the season. As a redshirt senior in 2015, Martin started all 13 games for the Irish, helping establish a running game that rushed for 207.6 yards per game, the highest since 1998.

Professional career

Houston Texans
The Houston Texans selected Martin in the second round (50th overall) of the 2016 NFL Draft. On May 13, 2016, the Texans signed Martin to a four-year, $4.77 million rookie contract that includes $2.33 million guaranteed and a signing bonus of $1.67 million.

On August 25, 2016, he underwent ankle surgery and was ruled out for the entire 2016 season. On August 30, 2016, he was placed on injured reserve.

Martin started the first 14 games of the season at center for the Texans before suffering an ankle injury in Week 15. He was placed on injured reserve on December 19, 2017. On September 10, 2019, Martin signed a three-year, $33 million contract extension with $18.5 million guaranteed with the Texans. On February 26, 2021, Martin was released by the Texans.

Las Vegas Raiders
Martin signed with the Las Vegas Raiders on March 24, 2021. He was named the backup center to Andre James for the entire season.

New Orleans Saints
On July 26, 2022, Martin signed with the New Orleans Saints. He was released on August 30, 2022 and signed to the practice squad the next day. He was released on September 10.

Washington Commanders
Martin signed a one-year contract with the Washington Commanders on September 20, 2022. Following Wes Schweitzer being placed on injured reserve, Martin took over as the starting center in Week 4. Two weeks later, the Commanders relieved him of the starting role after activating Tyler Larsen off the PUP list. In the Week 13 game against the New York Giants, Martin subbed in for Larsen in the fourth quarter after the latter was carted off the field.

Personal life
Nick's older brother, Zack, is a Pro Bowl offensive guard for the Dallas Cowboys. His father Keith played defensive tackle for Kentucky in the early 1980s.

References

External links
Notre Dame Fighting Irish bio

1993 births
Living people
American football centers
Houston Texans players
Las Vegas Raiders players
Notre Dame Fighting Irish football players
Players of American football from Indianapolis
New Orleans Saints players
Washington Commanders players